Manuel Mendoza (born October 10, 1976) is an Ecuadorian football defender.

Club career
In the 2002-03 season, Mendoza played for the Bulgarian side Levski Sofia, with whom he won the Bulgarian Cup.

Although not scoring a single goal in the Premier League, Mendoza scored in the last minute against the arch-rivals CSKA Sofia in the semi-final of the Bulgarian Cup, giving Levski a 1-0 win and entering Levski's folklore forever. Mendoza is the first Ecuadorian player in Bulgarian football.

After the end of the season, he returned to Deportivo Cuenca and became a champion of Ecuador in 2004.

In Ecuador, Mendoza played also for LDU Portoviejo, SD Aucas, Deportivo Quito, Deportivo Azogues and CD Olmedo.

Club playing honours
 Levski Sofia
 Bulgarian Cup: 2003

 Deportivo Cuenca
 Ecuadorian Serie A: 2004

References

External links

1976 births
Living people
People from Velasco Ibarra
Ecuadorian footballers
Association football defenders
C.S. Emelec footballers
C.D. Cuenca footballers
PFC Levski Sofia players
L.D.U. Portoviejo footballers
S.D. Aucas footballers
S.D. Quito footballers
Deportivo Azogues footballers
C.D. Olmedo footballers
First Professional Football League (Bulgaria) players
Ecuadorian expatriate footballers
Expatriate footballers in Bulgaria
Ecuadorian expatriate sportspeople in Bulgaria